A naval engagement between USS Essex and HMS Alert took place on 13 August 1812, in which the light frigate, 32 (commanded by Capt. David Porter, USN) encountered and captured the British sloop , 20 (Captain T.L.P. Laugharne). With "so trifling a skirmish" Porter later said, Alert became the first American capture of the war.

The duel itself lasted a mere eight minutes, during which Essex fired only one broadside. Porter kept his gunports closed making Laugharne believe that Essex was a merchantman. This gave confidence to Laugharne in maneuvering his ship within pistol shot range of Essex, which in turn ran out her carronades and devastated Alert.

Alert remained in United States service until 1829.

A shipment of 3rd pattern Brown Bess sea service muskets was found aboard Alert, which went towards arming the American Marines at the Washington and Boston Navy Yards.  They were preferred for their larger caliber, longer bayonets, and shorter barrels.

References

Naval battles of the War of 1812
August 1812 events